Jesse McCartney (born April 9, 1987) is an American actor and singer. He achieved fame in the late 1990s on the daytime drama All My Children as JR Chandler. He later joined boy band Dream Street, and eventually branched out into a solo musical career. Additionally, McCartney has appeared on shows such as Law & Order: SVU, Summerland, and Greek. McCartney also is known for lending his voice as Theodore in Alvin and the Chipmunks and its sequels, as well as voicing JoJo McDodd in Horton Hears a Who, Robin/Nightwing in Young Justice, and Roxas and Ventus in the video game series Kingdom Hearts developed by Square Enix.

Early life
McCartney was born in Ardsley, Westchester, New York, the son of Ginger McCartney and Scott McCartney. He began performing in local community musicals at the age of seven, when he debuted his role in Oliver!, before joining the national tour of  The King and I at age ten along with Phil of the Future star Ricky Ullman. There he played the character of Louis. In 1998, he sang with the group Sugar Beats and can be heard on their 1998, 1999, and 2000 CD releases.

Music career

1999–2002: Dream Street
In 1999, McCartney joined the American pop boy band Dream Street, and was a member until 2002. He described the experience as a good "stepping stone" for his solo career. The group earned a gold record with their debut CD. At fifteen, he began work on a solo career with a local band, featuring musicians Dillon Kondor (guitar), Peter Chema (bass), Katie Spencer (keyboards), Alex Russeku (drums), Karina LaGravinese (background vocals), Sharisse Francisco (background vocals), and under the management of Ginger McCartney and Sherry Goffin Kondor, who co-produced his first album Beautiful Soul.

McCartney released his first solo EP in July 2003. The album featured three songs: "Beautiful Soul", "Don't You", "Why Don't You Kiss Her". In 2004, he performed a duet with Anne Hathaway, "Don't Go Breaking My Heart", which is featured on the Ella Enchanted soundtrack.

2004–2006: Beautiful Soul and Right Where You Want Me

McCartney's debut solo album, Beautiful Soul, which was two years in the making, was released on September 28, 2004 in the United States and over a year later in Europe. He categorized it as a "pop record" with twists of urban. The album featured four songs that he co-wrote. Beautiful Soul reached number 15 on the Billboard 200. The album has been certified platinum by the Recording Industry Association of America, denoting over one million units of shipment to US retailers; it is his highest-certified album as of early 2009. By mid-2006, the album sold more than 1.5 million copies. The album's lead single of the same name reached number 16 on the Billboard Hot 100. McCartney was one of the artists to win multiple awards at the 2005 Teen Choice Awards, including Choice Crossover Artist, Choice Male Artist and Choice Breakout, Male. The following year, he won Favorite Male Singer at the Nickelodeon Kids' Choice Awards.

His first headlining tour, also named Beautiful Soul, began on May 2, 2005 at the Crest Theatre in Sacramento, California. The United States portion of the tour spanned 56 stops, ending on September 10, 2005 at the Madera District County Fair in Madera, California. In the fall of 2005, McCartney toured Australia, and opened for the Backstreet Boys in Europe in the summer of 2005. His July 9 performance at California's Great America in Santa Clara, California was recorded, released as Live: The Beautiful Soul Tour in November 2005.

After the filming of Keith wrapped, McCartney began working on his second album, Right Where You Want Me, co-writing all but one of the songs featured in it. Right Where You Want Me is more mature than his debut, reflecting his musical and personal growth since he recorded his debut album at age 15. Released by Hollywood Records on September 19, 2006, the album reached number 14 on the Billboard 200.

2007–2009: Songwriting and Departure
In the fall of 2007, McCartney co-wrote the hit song "Bleeding Love" with Ryan Tedder of OneRepublic, produced by McCartney and Tedder for McCartney's third album, but gave it away to British singer Leona Lewis for her debut album Spirit. The song was nominated for Record of the Year at the 2009 Grammy Awards. McCartney recorded his own version, which was released on some editions of his Departure album.

McCartney released his third album, Departure, on May 20, 2008 in the United States and Canada. Musically, it is a departure from his early works, showcasing more mature themes. The album has reached number 14 on the Billboard 200.

The album's lead single, "Leavin'", was released in March 2008, and reached number 10 on the Billboard Hot 100, giving McCartney his highest-charting single to date. The single was certified platinum by the RIAA, selling over two million downloads on iTunes, becoming McCartney's highest-certified single as of early 2009. The second single, "It's Over", was released on August 26, 2008, and reached #62 on the Hot 100. McCartney promoted Departure on a co-headlining tour with Jordin Sparks, which began in August 2008 and ended in September. He also did solo shows at theaters and small venues to support the album while on tour with Sparks. Sparks also approached him to write some material for her.

McCartney re-released Departure on April 7, 2009. The re-release, Departure: Recharged, featured four new songs: "Body Language", "Oxygen", "Crash & Burn", and "In My Veins". The re-release also features a remix of "How Do You Sleep?" with rapper-actor Ludacris. The third single from the album was released from the re-release and was the remix of "How Do You Sleep?". It was much more successful than the second single, reaching #26 on the Hot 100. The fourth and final single from the album was also released from the re-release and was a new version of "Body Language" featuring T-Pain. The single reached #35 on the Hot 100.

2010–2014: Have It All and In Technicolor

The lead single from his fourth studio album Have It All, "Shake", was sent to radio on September 8, 2010 and was released digitally on September 21, 2010. The song peaked at #54 on the Hot 100. On October 18, 2010, it was announced that Have It All would be released in January 2011. On November 30, it was announced that the album release would be pushed up to December 28, 2010, the Tuesday following Christmas. On December 3, 2010, McCartney announced through his Facebook page that he pushed the release date for the album back to early 2011. On April 7, 2011, McCartney responded to a question on his Twitter page about the delay, saying it hinged on pickup of Locke & Key. On November 3, McCartney said via his WhoSay page "2012 is still the magic year for the record to finally come out." On May 6, 2012, McCartney's mother said on Twitter that the replacement of the President of his label, Hollywood Records, in January 2012 was delaying the release of his album. In the March 2013 issue of Glamouholic magazine that he has covered, an exclusive interview was conducted and he confirmed the release of his anticipated fourth studio album, after all the disbandments of his record label, within this year. Have It All, however, would go on to never be officially released.

On May 13, it was confirmed on On Air with Ryan Seacrest that McCartney would be joining the Backstreet Boys and DJ Pauly D on their In a World Like This Tour, which kicked off on August 2, 2013. On August 13, the singer released "Back Together", the lead single from his fifth studio album, published by the independent label Eight0Eight Records. He performed it live on the Today show on August 15, 2013. On December 10, 2013, McCartney released a four-song EP titled In Technicolor, Part 1, followed by the single "Superbad", released on May 6, 2014. McCartney's fifth studio album, In Technicolor, was released on July 22, 2014. The third single off the album, "Punch Drunk Recreation", was released on November 19, 2014.

2018–present: The Resolution Tour Live, Dream Street Reunion, and New Stage
On March 23, 2018, McCartney announced the release of his new single "Better With You" with the music video featuring actress Danielle Campbell. He later released a second single titled "Wasted" with a music video directed by Jason Lester, followed by the live album The Resolution Tour Live.

In 2020, McCartney competed on the third season of The Masked Singer as "Turtle". He finished as the runner-up. On April 10, 2020, he released the music video for the single "Yours". The single "Friends" was released on May 19, 2020. The official music video featured former Greek castmates Scott Michael Foster, Jacob Zachar, and Paul James.

On June 2, 2020, McCartney's former Dream Street bandmate Chris Trousdale died at a hospital in Burbank, California, at the age of 34 due to complications from an unknown illness during the COVID-19 pandemic in California. It was later revealed that COVID-19 was the main complication of Trousdale's death. On June 11, 2020, on what would be Trousdale's 35th birthday, McCartney and his former Dream Street bandmates Greg Raposo, Frankie Galasso, and Matt Ballinger reunited for a virtual performance of "It Happens Every Time" to pay tribute to Trousdale. This would be the first public appearance of Dream Street together as a group since the disbandment over the lawsuits prior.

McCartney's fifth studio album, New Stage was released on October 8, 2021. The record was preceded by two singles: "Kiss The World Goodbye" and "Party for Two". To promote the album, McCartney embarked on his North American tour, to run from November 4 to December 8, 2021.

Other ventures

Acting career
McCartney appeared with The Who's Roger Daltrey in A Christmas Carol at Madison Square Garden. From 1998–2001, McCartney played Adam Chandler Jr. in the ABC soap opera All My Children, a role for which he earned two Young Artist Awards and two Daytime Emmy Award nominations. He also later starred in the short-lived series Summerland, which aired on The WB for two seasons, playing orphaned teenager Bradin Westerly.

 
In 2005, McCartney appeared as himself on the Disney Channel show The Suite Life of Zack & Cody. In 2007, he starred as himself on the Disney Channel show Hannah Montana. In 2008, McCartney was also featured as the voice of JoJo McDodd in Horton Hears a Who! McCartney also voiced Theodore in the live-action Alvin and the Chipmunks film series, in addition to voicing Terence in the Tinker Bell film series. He also voices Robin/Nightwing in the Young Justice series.

In 2008, McCartney co-starred along with Elisabeth Harnois in an independent teenage drama feature film, Keith, directed by Todd Kessler. It was his movie debut, and features McCartney in the title role. Keith was released on September 19, 2008.

According to Entertainment Weekly, in December 2008, McCartney was negotiating to play against type in the role of the Fire Nation's Prince Zuko in M. Night Shyamalan's feature film adaptation of Avatar: The Last Airbender. In February 2009, British actor Dev Patel replaced McCartney, whose tour dates conflicted with a boot camp scheduled for the cast to train in martial arts. McCartney has expressed an interest in directing and producing films and even considered enrolling in a film school.

McCartney appeared as a recurring character in the ABC Family series Greek for several episodes playing a star football talent who joins Kappa Tau. His character eventually decides to depledge the fraternity after citing pressures between football and Greek life combined with Rusty stealing his girlfriend Jordan.

McCartney also worked in several installments of the Square Enix video game series Kingdom Hearts. He was featured as Roxas in Kingdom Hearts II in 2006, and reprised the role in 2009 in Kingdom Hearts 358/2 Days. He also provided the voice work for Ventus, a character in the video game of the same series Kingdom Hearts Birth by Sleep. He reprised both roles in Kingdom Hearts 3D: Dream Drop Distance, released in 2012, as well as in Kingdom Hearts III, released in 2019.

McCartney also starred in the horror film Chernobyl Diaries, released on May 25, 2012. He has been added to the Season 7 (2013) cast of the Lifetime Network series Army Wives, portraying a young soldier deployed to Afghanistan with an 18-year-old wife at home.

In the summer of 2014, McCartney had a guest-starring role in the ABC Family series Young & Hungry. McCartney played "Cooper", a computer hacker with a romantic interest in the show's lead, played by Emily Osment.

In 2016, McCartney appeared on Fear the Walking Dead as Reed, an aggressive member of a group of pirates.

Jesse McCartney's acting career also includes voice over work (or voice acting) with Breathe Bible.

Philanthropy
In 2005, McCartney participated in "Come Together Now", a charity single to benefit the victims of the 2004 Asian tsunami and the 2005 Hurricane Katrina.

Later in 2005, McCartney signed on as an official supporter of Little Kids Rock, a nonprofit organization that provides free musical instruments and instruction to children in underserved public schools throughout the U.S.A. He sits on LKR's Honorary Board of Directors.

He has donated proceeds of his 2005 tour for disaster relief, recorded radio spots promoting the "Kids For A Drug-Free America" campaign, is a spokesperson for the St. Jude Children's Research Hospital, and is involved in the charity SPACE, which was co-founded by a childhood friend of his mother's. McCartney performed at the Hope Rocks concert in 2005 to benefit the City of Hope Cancer Center. He appeared in the Concert for Hope on October 25, 2009, with Miley Cyrus and Demi Lovato.

Personal life
In September 2019, he got engaged to his girlfriend of seven years, Katie Peterson and married her on October 23, 2021.

Awards and nominations

Behind the Voice Actors Awards

|-
| 2012
| rowspan="2"|Young Justice
| rowspan="2"|Best Vocal Ensemble in a Television Series
| 
|-
| rowspan="2"|2013
| 
|-
| Kingdom Hearts 3D: Dream Drop Distance
| Best Vocal Ensemble in a Video Game
| 
|-
| 2014
| Young Justice
| Best Vocal Ensemble in a Television Series
|

Groovevolt Music and Fashion Awards

|-
| rowspan=3|2006
| "Beautiful Soul"
| Best Pop Song Performance - Male
| 
|-
| Beautiful Soul
| Best Pop Album - Male
| 
|-
| "Stupid Things"
| rowspan=2|Best Pop Deep Cut
| 
|-
| 2007
| "Invincible"
|

Radio Disney Music Awards

|-
| rowspan=4|2005
| Himself
| Best Male Artist
| 
|-
| rowspan=2|"Beautiful Soul"
| Song of the Year
| 
|-
| Best Song You Can't Believe Your Parents Know the Words To
| 
|-
| "Good Life"
| Best TV Movie Song
| 
|-
| 2006
| rowspan=2|Himself
| rowspan=2|Best Male Artist
| 
|-
| 2007
|

Teen Choice Awards

|-
| rowspan="7"|2005
| rowspan="4"|Himself
| Choice Music: Male Artist
| 
|-
| Choice Music: Breakout Artist - Male
| 
|-
| Choice Crossover Artist
| 
|-
| Choice Hottie: Male
| 
|-
| Summerland
| Choice TV Actor: Drama
| 
|-
| rowspan="2"|"Beautiful Soul"
| Choice Music: Single
| 
|-
| Choice Music: Love Song
| 
|-
| 2006
| rowspan="3"|Himself
| Choice Music: V-Cast Artist
| 
|-
| rowspan="3"|2008
| Choice Music: Male Artist
| 
|-
| Choice Fanatic Fans
| 
|-
| "Leavin'"
| Choice Summer Song
| 
|-
| 2009
| "How Do You Sleep?"
| Choice Music: Love Song
| 
|-
| 2012
| Alvin and the Chipmunks: Chipwrecked
| Choice Movie Voice
|

Young Artist Awards

|-
| 2000
| rowspan=3|All My Children
| Best Performance in a Soap Opera - Young Actor
| 
|-
| 2001
| Best Performance in a Daytime TV Series: Young Actor
| 
|-
| 2002
| Best Performance in a TV Drama Series: Supporting Young Actor
| 
|-
| 2005
| Summerland
| Best Performance in a TV Series (Comedy or Drama) - Leading Young Actor
|

Other awards

{| class=wikitable
|-
! Year !! Awards !! Work !! Category !! Result
|-
| rowspan=2|2001
| Soap Opera Digest Awards
| rowspan=3|All My Children
| Outstanding Child Actor 
| 
|-
| rowspan=2|Daytime Emmy Awards
| rowspan=2|Outstanding Younger Actor in a Drama Series
| 
|-
| 2002
| 
|-
| rowspan=7|2005
| rowspan=3|Nickelodeon Australian Kids' Choice Awards
| rowspan=4|Himself
| Fave Music Artist 
| 
|-
| Fave TV Star
| 
|-
| Fave Hottie
| 
|-
| American Music Awards
| Favorite Breakthrough Artist
| 
|-
| MTV Video Music Awards
| rowspan=4|"Beautiful Soul"
| Best Pop Video
| 
|-
| ASCAP Pop Music Awards
| Most Performed Song 
| 
|-
| Billboard Music Awards
| Top Soundtrack Single
| 
|-
| 2006
| APRA Music Awards
| Most Performed Foreign Work
| 
|-
| 2010
| ASCAP Pop Music Awards
| "Bleeding Love"
| Most Performed Song 
| 
|-
| 2012
| Online Film & Television Association
| Young Justice
| Best Voice-Over Performance 
|

Discography

Beautiful Soul (2004)
Right Where You Want Me (2006)
Departure (2008)
Have It All (2010)
In Technicolor (2014)
New Stage (2021)

Tours
Headlining
 Beautiful Soul Tour (2004–05)
 Right Where You Want Me Tour (2006–07)
 Departure Mini-Tour (2008)
 Headlining Tour (2009)
 Jesse McCartney: In Technicolor Tour (2014)
 Better With You U.S. Tour (2018)
 The Resolution Tour (2019)
 The New Stage Tour (2022)

Co-headlining
 Jesse & Jordin LIVE Tour (2008)

Opening act
 Backstreet Boys: Never Gone Tour (2005)
 New Kids on the Block: Full Service Summer Tour (2009)
 Backstreet Boys: In A World Like This Tour (2013)

Filmography

Film

Television

Video games

References

External links

 
 
 

 
1987 births
Living people
20th-century American male actors
21st-century American male actors
21st-century American singers
American child singers
American male child actors
American male film actors
American male pop singers
American male singer-songwriters
American male soap opera actors
American male television actors
American male video game actors
American male voice actors
American philanthropists
Dream Street members
Hollywood Records artists
Male actors from New York (state)
People from Ardsley, New York
Republic Records artists
Singer-songwriters from New York (state)